Born to Dance is a reality dance competition show for women on BET starring Laurieann Gibson which debuted on August 2, 2011 at 10:00pm. Contestants will compete for a prize of $50,000 which will go to the winner. Auditions for the show were held in New York City, Los Angeles and Atlanta.  The series premier averaged  1.2 million viewers. On the final episode broadcast September 20, 2011, LaTonya Swann was announced as the winner.

Show format

The 20 contestants are:

See also
 Dancing with the Stars
 Live to Dance
 Soul Train
 American Bandstand
 America's Best Dance Crew
 Dance Fever
 So You Think You Can Dance

References

Dance competition television shows
English-language television shows
2011 American television series debuts